The Quaker Oats Company, known as Quaker, is an American food conglomerate based in Chicago. It has been owned by PepsiCo since 2001.

History

Precursor miller companies

In the 1850s, Ferdinand Schumacher and Robert Stuart founded oat mills. Schumacher founded the German Mills American Oatmeal Company in Akron, Ohio, and Stuart founded the North Star Mills in Hearst, Rupert's Land. In 1870, Schumacher ran his first known cereal advertisement in the Akron Beacon Journal newspaper. In 1877, the Quaker Mill Company of Ravenna, Ohio was founded. "The name was chosen when Quaker Mill partner Henry Seymour found an encyclopedia article on Quakers and decided that the qualities described — integrity, honesty, purity — provided an appropriate identity for the company's oat product." Quaker Mill Company held the trademark on the Quaker name. In Ravenna, Ohio, on 4 September 1877, Henry Seymour of the Quaker Mill Company applied for the first trademark for a breakfast cereal, "a man in 'Quaker garb'". 

In 1879, John Stuart and his son Robert joined with George Douglas to form Imperial Mill and set up their operation in Chicago, Illinois. In 1881, Henry Crowell bought the Quaker Mill Company; the following year, he launched a national advertising campaign for Quaker Oats, introducing a cereal box that made it possible to buy in quantities other than bulk. He also bought the bankrupt Quaker Oat Mill Company in Ravenna, and held the key positions of general manager, president and chairman of the company from 1888 until late 1943, becoming known as the cereal tycoon. He donated more than 70% of his wealth to the Crowell Trust.

In 1888, the American Cereal Company was formed by the merger of seven major oat millers. Ferdinand Schumacher became president, Henry Crowell, general manager, and John Stuart the secretary-treasurer. In 1889, the American Cereal Company introduced the half-ounce trial size and, as a promotion, they distributed one to every home in Portland, Oregon via boys on bicycles. Later, this promotion was extended to other cities. A second promotion involved placing dinner plates within the then-regular (not round) boxes of oats.

Quaker Oats Company
In 1901, the Quaker Oats Company was founded in New Jersey with headquarters in Chicago, by the merger of four oat mills: the Quaker Mill Company in Ravenna, Ohio, which held the trademark on the Quaker name; the cereal mill in Cedar Rapids, Iowa owned by John Stuart, his son Robert Stuart, and their partner George Douglas; the German Mills American Oatmeal Company in Akron, Ohio, owned by Schumacher; The Rob Lewis & Co. American Oats and Barley Oatmeal Corporation. Formally known as "Good For Breakfast" instant oatmeal mix. In the same year, the whole merged company was acquired by Henry Parsons Crowell, who also bought the bankrupt Quaker Oat Mill Company, also in Ravenna. 

In 1908, Quaker Oats introduced the first in a series of cookie recipes on the box. In 1911, Quaker Oats purchased the Great Western Cereal Company. The iconic cylindrical package made its first appearance in 1915. Later that year, Quaker offered the first cereal box premium to buyers. By sending in one dollar and the cutout picture of the "Quaker Man" customers received a double boiler for the cooking of oatmeal. 

In the 1920s, Quaker introduced "Quaker Quick Oats" an early convenience food, and also offered a crystal radio set built in the same cylindrical canister as Quick Oats, with the same label, for US$1 plus two trademarks cut from Quaker Oats packages. In the 1930s, Quaker was one of the many companies using the Dionne Quintuplets for promotional purposes. Quaker Oats in Cedar Rapids, Iowa, was photographed during the 1930s by Theodor Horydczak, who documented the building, operations, and factory workers at the plant.

During World War II, the company, through its subsidiary the Q. O. Ordnance Company, operated the Cornhusker Ordnance Plant (six miles west of Grand Island) as a government-owned, contractor-operated 11,960-acre site. Construction began in March 1942 and production ended on 15 August 1945. It manufactured millions of pieces of various artillery munitions (41 warehouses and 219 magazines of total 280,800 ft² were built).

In 1946, artist Jim Nash was commissioned to produce a head portrait of the Quaker Man, which became the basis for Haddon Sundblom's famous version of 1957. In 1972, John Mills designed the current logo.

From 1946 to 1953, researchers from Quaker Oats, MIT and Harvard University carried out experiments at the Walter E. Fernald State School to determine how the minerals from cereals were metabolized. Parents of mentally challenged children were asked for permission to let their children be members of a Science Club and participate in research. Being a member of the Science Club gave the children special privileges. The parents were told that the children would be fed with a diet high in nutrients. However, they were not told (and the consent form contained no information indicating) that the food their children were fed contained radioactive calcium and iron. The information obtained from the experiments was to be used as part of an advertising campaign. The company was later sued because of the experiments. The lawsuit was settled on 31 December 1997.

In 1968, a plant was built in Danville, Illinois, which now makes Pearl Milling Company pancake mixes, Oat Squares, Life Cereals Quaker Oh's, Bumpers, Quisp, King Vitamin Natural Granola Cereals, and Chewy granola bars, as well as Puffed Rice for use as an ingredient for other products in other plants.

In 1969, Quaker acquired Fisher-Price, a toy company. In the 1970s, the company financed the making of the film Willy Wonka & the Chocolate Factory, in return obtaining a license to use a number of the product names mentioned in the movie for candy bars. In 1991, Quaker Oats spun off its Fisher-Price division.

In 1982, Quaker Oats purchased US Games, a company that created games for the Atari 2600. It went out of business after one year. That same year, Quaker Oats acquired Florida-based orange juice plant Ardmore Farms, which it would own until selling it to Country Pure Foods in 1998.

In 1983, Quaker bought Stokely-Van Camp, Inc., makers of Van Camp's and Gatorade.

Quaker bought Snapple for $1.7 billion in 1994 and sold it to Triarc in 1997 for $300 million.  Triarc sold it to Cadbury Schweppes for $1.45 billion in September 2000. It was spun off in May 2008 to its current owners, Dr Pepper Snapple Group.

In 1996, Quaker spun off its frozen food business, selling it to Aurora Foods (which was bought by Pinnacle Foods in 2004).

In August 2001, PepsiCo acquired Quaker Oats for $14 billion, primarily for its Gatorade brand of soft drink. The merger created the fourth-largest consumer goods company in the world. Though the main prize of PepsiCo was Gatorade non-carbonated sports drink, Quaker's cereal and snack food division complemented the existing Frito-Lay salty-snacks division.

Actor Wilford Brimley appeared in television commercials for Quaker beginning in the late 1980s. In the commercials, he extolled the virtues of oat consumption, typically to a young child, as to introduce the concept of oatmeal consumption as a long tradition.

Major facility

The major Canadian production facility for Quaker Oats is located in Peterborough, Ontario. The factory was first established as the American Cereal Company in 1902 on the shores of the Otonabee River during that city's period of industrialization. At the time, the city was known as "The Electric City" due to its hydropower resources, attracting many companies to the site to take advantage of this source. The Trent–Severn Waterway also promised to provide an alternate shipping route from inland areas around the city, although it appears this was never used in practice. On 11 December 1916, the factory all but completely burned to the ground. When the smoke had settled, 23 people had died and Quaker was left with $2,000,000 in damages. Quaker went on to rebuild the facility, incorporating the few areas of the structure that were not destroyed by fire.

When PepsiCo purchased Quaker Oats in 2001, many brands were consolidated from facilities around Canada to the Peterborough location, which assumed the new QTG (Quaker Tropicana Gatorade) moniker. Local production includes Quaker Oatmeal, Quaker Chewy bars, Cap'n Crunch cereal, Pearl Milling Company instant pancake mixes and pancake syrups, Quaker Oat Bran and Corn Bran cereals, Gatorade sports drinks, and the Propel fitness water sub-brand, Tropicana juices, and various Frito-Lay snack products. Products are easily identified by the manufactured by address on the packaging. The Peterborough facility supplies the majority of Canada and exports limited portions to the United States. The Quaker plant sells cereal production byproducts to companies that use them to create fire logs and pellets.

Land giveaways in cereal boxes
Starting in 1902, the company's oatmeal boxes came with a coupon redeemable for the legal deed to a tiny lot in Milford, Connecticut. The lots, sometimes as small as 10 feet by 10 feet, were carved out of a 15-acre, never-built subdivision called "Liberty Park". A small number of children (or their parents), often residents living near Milford, redeemed their coupons for the free deeds and started paying the extremely small property taxes on the "oatmeal lots". The developer of the prospective subdivision hoped the landowners would hire him to build homes on the lots, although several tracts would need to be combined before building could start. The legal deeds created a large amount of paperwork for town tax collectors, who frequently couldn't find the property owners and received almost no tax revenue from them. In the mid-1970s, the town put an end to the oatmeal lots with a "general foreclosure" condemning nearly all of the property, which is now part of a BiC Corporation plant.

In 1955, Quaker Oats again gave away land as part of a promotion, this one tied to the Sergeant Preston of the Yukon television show in the United States. The company offered in its Puffed Wheat and Puffed Rice cereal boxes genuine deeds to land in the Klondike.

Logo

Starting in 1877, the Quaker Oats logo had a figure of a Quaker man depicted full-length, sometimes holding a scroll with the word "Pure" written across it, resembling the classic woodcuts of William Penn (founder of the Province of Pennsylvania), the 17th-century philosopher and early Quaker. Quaker Oats advertising dating back to 1909 did, indeed, identify the "Quaker man" as William Penn, and referred to him as "standard bearer of the Quakers and of Quaker Oats." 

In 1946, graphic designer Jim Nash created a black-and-white head-and-shoulders portrait of the smiling Quaker Man, and Haddon Sundblom's now-familiar color head-and-shoulders portrait (using fellow Coca-Cola artist Harold W. McCauley as the model) debuted in 1957. The monochromatic 1969 Quaker Oats Company logo, modeled after the Sundblom illustration, was created by Saul Bass, a graphic designer known for his motion picture title sequences and corporate logos. In 2012, the company enlisted the firm of Hornall Anderson to give the "Quaker man" a slimmer, somewhat younger look. The man is now sometimes referred to as "Larry" by insiders at Quaker Oats. And in 1965, a new advertising slogan was introduced: "Nothing is better for thee, than me".

The company states that their current "Quaker man" logo "does not represent an actual person. His image is that of a man dressed in Quaker garb, including a Quaker hat, chosen because the Quaker faith projected the values of honesty, integrity, purity and strength."

The company has never had any ties with the Religious Society of Friends (Quakers). When the company was being built up, Quaker businessmen were known for their honesty (truth is often considered a Quaker testimony). The Straight Dope writes "According to the good folks at Quaker Oats, the Quaker Man was America's first registered trademark for a breakfast cereal, his registration taking place on September 4th, 1877."

Members of the Religious Society of Friends  have occasionally expressed frustration at being confused with the Quaker Oats representation. In recent years, Friends have twice protested the Quaker name being used for advertising campaigns seen as promoting violence. In 1990, some Quakers started a letter-writing campaign after a Quaker Oats advertisement depicted Popeye as a "Quakerman" who used violence against aliens, sharks, and Bluto. Later that decade, more letters were sparked by Power Rangers toys included in Cap'n Crunch cereal.

Informed consent controversy, research on children
From 1946 to 1953, researchers from Quaker Oats Company, MIT and Harvard University carried out experiments at the Walter E. Fernald State School to determine how the minerals from cereals were metabolized. Parents of disabled children were asked for permission to let their children be members of a Science Club and participate in research. Being a member of the Science Club gave the children special privileges. The parents were told that the children would be fed with a diet high in nutrients. They were not told that the food their children were fed contained radioactive calcium and iron, and the consent form contained no information indicating this. The information obtained from the experiments was to be used as part of an advertising campaign. The company was later sued because of the experiments. The lawsuit was settled on 31 December 1997.

Trans fat content and litigation
In 2010, two California consumers filed a class action lawsuit against the Quaker Oats Company. The plaintiffs alleged that Quaker marketed its products as healthy even though they contained unhealthy trans fat. Specifically, Quaker's Chewy Granola Bars, Instant Oatmeal, and Oatmeal to Go Bars contained trans fat, yet their packaging featured claims like "heart healthy," "wholesome," and "smart choices made easy."  The plaintiffs' complaint cited current scientific evidence that trans fat causes coronary heart disease and is associated with a higher risk of diabetes and some forms of cancer.  In 2014, Quaker agreed to remove trans fats from its products, at a cost of $1.4 million, although the company denied false or misleading labelling.

US brands
, these are the product brands marketed under the Quaker Oats name in the US:

Breakfast cereals

 Cap'n Crunch
 Life cereal
 Quisp
 Mother's Natural Foods
 Quaker 100% Natural Granola
 Kretschmer Wheat Germ
 Mr. T Cereal
 Muffets ("The round shredded wheat")
 Quaker Oatmeal Squares
 Quaker Toasted Oatmeal
 Quaker Oh's
 Quaker Corn Bran
 Quaker Oat Bran
 Quaker Grits
 Quaker Oatmeal
 Quaker Instant Oatmeal
 Quaker Puffed Rice
 Quaker Puffed Wheat
 Quaker Oatmeal with Dinosaur Eggs
 Graham Bumpers
 Coco Bumpers
 King Vitaman

Other breakfast foods
 Quaker Oatmeal To Go (re-branded from Breakfast Squares in 2006)
 Pearl Milling Company (re-branded from Aunt Jemima in 2021)
 Quaker Breakfast Cookies

Snacks

 Quaker Crispy Minis (Rice Chips and Rice Cakes) (known as Snack-a-Jacks in the UK)
 Quakes Rice Snacks
 Quaker Soy Crisps
 Quaker Snack Bars
 Chewy Granola Bars
 Quaker Mini Delights
 Yogurt bars
 Quaker Oatmeal Cookies
 Greek Yogurt

Mixes
 Quaker Tortilla Mix
 Rice-A-Roni
 Pasta Roni
 Near East

Drinks
 Milk Chillers
 Tropicana fruit Juices
 Sunbolt (defunct)
 Moneng Refreshing Drinks
 Moneng Oat Power (Isotonic Drink)

UK brands
, these are the product brands marketed under the Quaker Oats name in the UK:

Breakfast cereals
 Honey Monster Puffs (Since sold to Big Bear t/a Honey Monster Foods)

Hot cereals
 Quaker Oats
 Oatso Simple (various flavours)
 Quaker Oats Super Goodness Porridge
 Quaker Oats Protein Porridge
 Scott's Porage Oats
 Scott's So Easy
 (the Scott's brand, previously a rival, is now also owned by Quaker)

Ready to eat cereal
 Harvest Crunch
 Quaker Wholesome Granola
 Quaker Oat Granola
 Quaker Oat Muesli
 Quaker Oat Crisp

Cereal bars
 Harvest Bar
 Oat Bars (Original with golden syrup or Mixed berry flavors)

Snacks
 New Quaker Fruit & Oat Squeeze
 New Quaker Porridge to Go
 Snack-a-Jacks

The Netherlands brands
These are the product brands marketed under the Quaker Oats name in the Netherlands:

Ready to eat cereal
 Quaker Cruesli

References

General references 
 D'Antonio, Michael. The State Boys Rebellion. New York: Simon & Schuster, 2004.

External links

 
  Quaker Oats Company from the Summit Memory Project
 Story about the radioactivity experiments

 
PepsiCo subsidiaries
Companies that filed for Chapter 11 bankruptcy in 1881
Food and drink companies established in 1901
1901 establishments in New Jersey
Food product brands
Breakfast cereal companies
Oats
Clio Award winners
2001 mergers and acquisitions
American corporate subsidiaries